South Jetty High School was a public high school in Warrenton, Oregon, United States. It was located at the North Coast Youth Correctional Facility, which closed down in 2017.

References

High schools in Clatsop County, Oregon
Boarding schools in Oregon
Public high schools in Oregon